"Kelsey" is a song by American pop band Metro Station. It was released on August 7, 2007 as the first single from their debut album, Metro Station. It was re-released on March 17, 2009, after the success of "Shake It" and "Seventeen Forever".

In addition, the Kelsey EP was released on September 28, 2009. The UK version was released on November 27, 2009 and features a cover version of "Last Christmas".

Background
The song was produced by Justin Pierre and Josh Cain from the band Motion City Soundtrack. Pierre also sings backing vocals and Cain played bass on the song.

The song was written about a girl named Kelsey. The track runs at 120 BPM and is in the key of C major. The single debuted at number 40 on the New Zealand Singles Chart and later peaked at number 25.

Critical reception

Tim Karan of Alternative Press gave a mixed review on Kelsey. He stated, "It's not that the songs on this EP are bad," praising songs such as "Kelsey" and "Japanese Girl" for its "killer synth hook." However was critical on the lyrical content of the EP.

Music video
The first version of the music video has all of the band members playing the song in split-screen. This version was released in 2007. The band re-shot the video in May 2009 and made a whole new music video which was released on Teen Nick on October 2, 2009. The video features actress Aimee Teegarden.

Track listing

Charts

Release history

References

2007 debut singles
Metro Station (band) songs
2007 songs